The 1994 Supercopa Libertadores was the seventh season of the Supercopa Libertadores, a club football tournament for past Copa Libertadores winners. The tournament was won by Independiente, who beat Boca Juniors 2–1 on aggregate in the final.

Teams

Knockout phase

Bracket

Round of 16
The matches were played from 7 September to 29 September.

|}

Quarterfinals
The matches were played from 5 October to 12 October.

|}

Semifinals
The matches were played from 19 October to 26 October.

|}

Final

|}

Independiente won 2–1 on aggregate.

See also
List of Copa Libertadores winners
1994 Copa Libertadores
1995 Recopa Sudamericana

External links
RSSSF
RSSSF (Full Details)

Supercopa Libertadores
2